The 2013–14 Loyola Marymount Lions men's basketball team represented Loyola Marymount University during the 2013–14 college basketball season. This Lions were coached by sixth year head coach Max Good. The Lions competed in the West Coast Conference and played their home games at Gersten Pavilion. They finished the season 13–19, 4–14 in WCC play to finish in last place. They advanced to the quarterfinals of the WCC tournament where they lost to BYU.

At the end of the season, head coach Max Good was fired. On March 12, former Charlotte Bobcats head coach Mike Dunlap was hired as Goods replacement.

Before the season

Departures

Roster

Schedule and results

|-
!colspan=12 style="background:#00345B; color:#8E0028;"| Exhibition

|-
!colspan=12 style="background:#8E0028; color:#00345B;"| Regular season

|-
!colspan=12 style="background:#8E0028; color:#00345B;"| 2014 West Coast tournament

Game summaries

Exhibition: Cal Lutheran

vs. Grand Canyon
Series History: First Meeting
Broadcasters: Matt Rosen, Rex Chapman & Barry Buetel

South Dakota State
Series History: First Meeting

Long Beach State
Series History: Long Beach State leads series 19-7

Northern Arizona
Series History: Loyola Marymount leads 7-2

Paradise Jam: Northern Iowa
Series History: First Meeting

Paradise Jam: Marist
Series History: Loyola Marymount leads 2-0

Paradise Jam: Vanderbilt
Series History: First Meeting

UC Riverside
Series History: UC Riverside leads 4-2

Pittsburgh
Series History: Loyola Marymount leads 1-0
Broadcasters: Tim Neverett and Curtis Aiken

Valparasio
Series History: Loyola Marymount leads 1-0

Cal Poly
Series History: Loyola Marymount leads 5-4

La Sierra
Series History: Loyola Marymount leads 2-0

BYU
Series History: BYU leads 4-3
Broadcasters: Barry Tompkins and Jarron Collins

San Diego
Series History: Series tied 43-43

San Francisco
Series History: San Francisco leads 107-39
Broadcasters: Pat Olson and Jim Brovelli

Santa Clara
Series History: Santa Clara leads 83-57
Broadcasters: Glen Kuiper and Dan Belluomini

San Diego
Series History: Loyola Marymount 34-33
Broadcasters: Ari Wolfe and Jon Crispin

BYU
Series History: Series Even 4-4
Broadcasters: Dave McCann, David Nixon, and Spencer Linton

Portland
Series History: Loyola Marymount 47-42
Broadcasters: Justin Alderson and Kris Johnson

Gonzaga
Series History: Gonzaga leads 58-23
Broadcasters: Steve Quis and Kris Johnson

Pacific
Series History: Series even 24-24
Broadcasters: Zach Bayrouty and Tod Bannister

Saint Mary's
Series History: Saint Mary's leads 81-54
Broadcasters: Roxy Bernstein and Stan Morrison

Pepperdine
Series History: Pepperdine leads 93-65
Broadcasters: Chris McGee, Dave Miller and Kelli Tennant

Saint Mary's
Series History: Saint Mary's leads 82-54
Broadcasters: Ari Wolfe, Jarron Collins, and Kelli Tennant

Pacific
Series History: Loyola Marymount leads 25-24
Broadcasters: Justin Alderson and Kris Johnson

Portland
Series History: Loyola Marymount 47-43
Broadcasters: Ray Crawford and Jordan Cornette

Gonzaga
Series History: Gonzaga leads 59-23
Broadcasters: Greg Heister, Richard Fox, and Dan Dickau

Pepperdine
Series History: Pepperdine leads 94-65
Broadcasters: Roxy Bernstein and Corey Williams

Santa Clara
Series History: Santa Clara leads 83-57
Broadcasters: Ari Wolfe and Jarron Collins

San Francisco
Series History: San Francisco leads 108-39
Broadcasters: Justin Alderson and Kris Johnson

WCC Tournament: Portland
Series History: Loyola Marymount 47-44
Broadcasters: Dave McCann, Blaine Fowler, and Spencer Linton

References

Loyola Marymount Lions men's basketball seasons
Loyola Marymount